London Temple may refer to:

One of several Swaminarayan temples in the London area:
BAPS Shri Swaminarayan Mandir London
Shree Sanatan Hindu Mandir 
Shree Ghanapathy Temple, Wimbledon 
Shri Swaminarayan Mandir, London (Willesden) 
Shri Swaminarayan Mandir, London (Harrow)  
Shri Swaminarayan Mandir, London (East London) 
Radha Krishna Temple - the headquarters of the International Society for Krishna Consciousness (ISKCON) in the United Kingdom.
London England Temple - the 12th operating temple of The Church of Jesus Christ of Latter-day Saints.
One of several Buddhist temples in the London area:
London Buddhist Vihara
London Buddhist Centre
London Fo Guang Shan Temple
Shaolin Temple UK
Wat Buddhapadipa